Adam Marek Korol (born 20 August 1974) is a Polish rower and Civic Platform politician. He won a gold medal in quadruple sculls at the 2008 Summer Olympics.  He was the Minister of Sport and Tourism from June 2015 to November 2015 and serves in the Sejm as of November 2015.

For his sport achievements, he received: 
 Knight's Cross of the Order of Polonia Restituta (5th Class) in 2008.

References

External links 
 
 
 
 

1974 births
Living people
Polish male rowers
Olympic rowers of Poland
Rowers at the 1996 Summer Olympics
Rowers at the 2000 Summer Olympics
Rowers at the 2004 Summer Olympics
Rowers at the 2008 Summer Olympics
Rowers at the 2012 Summer Olympics
Olympic gold medalists for Poland
Sportspeople from Gdańsk
Olympic medalists in rowing
Medalists at the 2008 Summer Olympics
World Rowing Championships medalists for Poland
Government ministers of Poland
Members of the Polish Sejm 2015–2019
Civic Platform politicians
Polish sportsperson-politicians
European Rowing Championships medalists
Recipients of the Order of Polonia Restituta